Beyssac is a commune of the Corrèze department in central France.

Population

Personalities
Beyssac was the birthplace of Étienne Aubert (1282 or 1295–1362), who became pope as Pope Innocent VI, and of Suzanne Lacore – born Marie Lacore – (1875-1975).

See also
Communes of the Corrèze department

References

Communes of Corrèze
Corrèze communes articles needing translation from French Wikipedia